Jody Folwell-Turipa (born 1942, Santa Clara Pueblo, New Mexico) is  a Puebloan potter and artist.

One of nine children in the Naranjo family of Santa Clara potters and other artists, Folwell is one of the best-known avant-garde Pueblo potters. Lee Cohen, the late owner of Gallery 10 in Santa Fe and Scottsdale, referred to Folwell as the "first impressionist potter" for her "innovative, off-round, uneven-lipped, asymmetrical polished pots". Folwell is known for her use of social commentary and satire in her pots.

In 1984, she collaborated with Chiricahua Apache sculptor Bob Haozous to create a pot that received the Best of Show award at Santa Fe Indian Market. Fowler's pots are in the permanent collection of the Smithsonian Institution's National Museum of the American Indian.

Folwell has two daughters, Susan Folwell and Polly Rose Folwell, who are both accomplished potters. In 2009 and 2010 the Heard Museum featured works by all three women in their Mothers & Daughters: Stories in Clay exhibition. Folwell’s mother, Rose Naranjo, was also a respected Santa Clara potter.

Of her work, Folwell has said, "I think of each piece as an artwork that has something to say on its own, a statement about life. I think of myself as being a contemporary potter and a traditionalist at the same time. Combining the two is very emotional and exciting to me."

Exhibits 
Hearts of Our People: Native Women Artists, (2019), Minneapolis Institute of Art, Minneapolis, Minnesota, United States.

See also
 Jody Naranjo, Jody Folwell's niece

References

External links

Jody Folwell's Personal Gallery
Jody Folwell, biography and essay by Susan Peterson, 1997
Jody, Susan and Polly Rose Folwell, "Clay Speaks" at Arizona State Museum
Avanyu in Color, by Jody Folwell. Judge’s Choice Award, 2011, Arizona State Museum

1942 births
Pueblo artists
Living people
Native American potters
Artists from New Mexico
Women potters
American women ceramists
American ceramists
20th-century Native Americans
21st-century Native Americans
20th-century Native American women
21st-century Native American women
Native American women artists